In DJing, phrasing, also called stage matching, refers to alignment of phrases of two tracks in a mix. This allows the transition between the tracks to be done without breaking the musical structure.

Phrasing is an aspect of beatmixing, not a separate technique. Because most music has a 4/4 time signature and a simple structure of 16-bar phrases, to align the phrases of two tracks it is often enough to start the track to be mixed in at a phrase boundary in the track currently playing. Careful phrasing can produce a seamless mix by making the breaks in two tracks coincide, or aligning the break in one track with the start of the beat in the other.

See also
Beatmatching
Beatmixing
Segue

References
Stage Matching from the Advanced Vinyl Handling DJing tutorial

DJing